The Regional Positioning and Timing System, shortly BKZS, is a space-based project of the Turkish Armed Forces on global positioning and time transfer by satellite navigation system. 

The aim of the project is to provide positioning and timing information, which Turkish Armed Forces need during peace, crisis and military operations, independently from the existing foreign systems, which can be disabled in times of conflict. The project is developed by the Defence Technologies and Engineering Inc. (Savunma Teknolojileri ve Mühendislik A.Ş.) (STM), a subsidiary of the Undersecretariat for Defence Industries. Currently, the project is in the first phase, comprising evaluation of the feasibility study. It is planned to launch five military reconnaissance and Earth observation satellites over the next few years.

References

Military equipment of Turkey
Space program of Turkey
Satellite navigation systems
Wireless locating
Time signal radio stations
Proposed military equipment